The following is a list of squads for each national team competing at the 2018 CONCACAF Women's U-17 Championship. The tournament will take place during April 2018 in Nicaragua and June 2018 in the United States. It will be the sixth U-17 age group competition organised by the CONCACAF.

Group A

Nicaragua
Manager: Jennifer Fernández

Mexico
Mexico named their squad on 14 April 2018.

Manager: Mónica Vergara

Puerto Rico
Manager:  Shek Borkowski

Haiti
Manager: Wilner Étienne & Fiorda Charles

Group B

United States
United States named their squad on 28 March 2018.

Manager: Mark Carr

Costa Rica
Costa Rica named their squad on 11 April 2018.

Manager: Harold López

Canada
Canada named their squad on 7 April 2018.

Manager: Bev Priestman

Bermuda
Bermuda named their squad on 6 April 2018.

Manager: Aaron Denkins

Notes

References

CONCACAF Women's U-17 Championship
Concacaf Women's U-17 Championship